Synaptosomal-associated protein 23 is a protein that in humans is encoded by the SNAP23 gene. Two alternative transcript variants encoding different protein isoforms have been described for this gene.

Function 

Specificity of vesicular transport is regulated, in part, by the interaction of a vesicle-associated membrane protein termed synaptobrevin/VAMP with a target compartment membrane protein termed syntaxin. These proteins, together with SNAP25 (synaptosome-associated protein of 25 kDa), form a complex which serves as a binding site for the general membrane fusion machinery. Synaptobrevin/VAMP and syntaxin are believed to be involved in vesicular transport in most, if not all cells, while SNAP25 is present almost exclusively in the brain, suggesting that a ubiquitously expressed homolog of SNAP25 exists to facilitate transport vesicle/target membrane fusion in other tissues.

SNAP23 is structurally and functionally similar to SNAP25 and binds tightly to multiple syntaxins and synaptobrevins/VAMPs. It is an essential component of the high affinity receptor for the general membrane fusion machinery and is an important regulator of transport vesicle docking and fusion.

Clinical significance 

In individuals with insulin resistance, SNAP23 is found to be translocated from the plasma membrane to the cytosol where it becomes associated with lipid droplets and is therefore unable to translocate GLUT-4 to the membrane, hindering glucose transport.

Interactions 

SNAP23 has been shown to interact with:

 Cystic fibrosis transmembrane conductance regulator, 
 KIF5B, 
  NAPA, 
 SNAPAP,
 STX11, 
 STX1A, 
 STX2, 
 STX4, 
 STX6, 
 SYBL1, 
 Syntaxin 3, 
 VAMP2, 
 VAMP3, and
 Vesicle-associated membrane protein 8.

References

Further reading